You Can't Ask That is a Canadian television documentary series, which premiered in 2019 on CBC Television. It also airs on Accessible Media Inc.'s AMI-tv. The series was produced by Izabel Chevrier and directed by Mariane McGraw.

An adaptation of the Australian series You Can't Ask That, it centres on people with disabilities, who help to educate viewers about their disabilities by answering many of the questions that people often want to know but feel like they're not allowed to ask.

The episodes include: Wheelchair Users, Tourette Syndrome, Visual Impairment, Autism, Limb Differences, Little People, Down Syndrome, and Facial Differences.

The series won the Canadian Screen Award for Best Factual Program or Series at the 9th Canadian Screen Awards in 2021.

Episodes

Season 1

Season 2

References

2019 Canadian television series debuts
2010s Canadian documentary television series
2020s Canadian documentary television series
CBC Television original programming
Canadian Screen Award-winning television shows
English-language television shows